Taekwondo New Zealand is the governing body for the sport of taekwondo in New Zealand.

Taekwondo New Zealand is the Member National Association for World Taekwondo in New Zealand, as recognised by World Taekwondo.

References

External links
 

Sports organizations established in 2014
2014 establishments in New Zealand
Sports governing bodies in New Zealand
National members of World Taekwondo
Taekwondo in New Zealand
National Taekwondo teams